Main Channel Bridge (Winona) consists of a pair of bridges, the original cantilever bridge, and a concrete box girder bridge completed in 2016, that span the main channel of the Mississippi River in the United States between Winona, Minnesota, and Latsch Island. Another bridge, the North Channel Bridge, connects the island to rural Buffalo County, Wisconsin. The bridge carries Minnesota State Highway 43, which continues as Wisconsin Highway 54 at the Minnesota/Wisconsin state line on the nearby North Channel Bridge; in Winona, it connects to Winona Street.

Construction on the original cantilever bridge was started just before the U.S. entered World War II, and the construction was hastened to finish in November 1942, despite labor shortages, difficulty obtaining materials, and high water. It was built in 1941–1942 by the Minnesota Department of Transportation (MnDOT).

On May 17, 2008, the United States Postal Service announced that the bridge would be on the Minnesota sesquicentennial commemorative stamp.

Following an inspection of the bridge's gusset plates, the Minnesota Department of Transportation closed the bridge on June 3, 2008, with over  detours as an alternative. The bridge reopened on June 14, 2008.

After considering a number of alternatives, including rehabilitation of only the original bridge, or construction of a new bridge and demolition of the original bridge, on August 23, 2012, the Minnesota Department of Transportation announced approval for plans to build a new two-lane concrete box girder bridge, prior to rehabilitating the original bridge. Construction of the new bridge began immediately upstream of the cantilever bridge in July 2014, and opened for traffic in August 2016. Following the opening of the new bridge, the original cantilever bridge closed for rehabilitation.  The rehabilitated cantilever bridge opened July 1, 2019, allowing 2 lanes in each direction.

Gallery

See also
List of bridges documented by the Historic American Engineering Record in Minnesota
List of bridges documented by the Historic American Engineering Record in Wisconsin
List of crossings of the Upper Mississippi River

References

External links

, includes both Main Channel and North Channel bridges

Road bridges in Minnesota
Bridges over the Mississippi River
Bridges completed in 1942
Road bridges in Wisconsin
1942 establishments in Minnesota
Steel bridges in the United States
Concrete bridges in the United States
Box girder bridges in the United States
Cantilever bridges in the United States
Historic American Engineering Record in Minnesota
Historic American Engineering Record in Wisconsin
Interstate vehicle bridges in the United States